Ivan "Ivica" Senzen (born 4 May 1951 in Sisak) is a Croatian retired footballer.

Playing career
After beginning his career at his hometown club Metalac Sisak, Senzen was picked up by Dinamo Zagreb in 1970. Senzen spent the next nine years playing for the club, and had appeared in a total of 447 matches and scored 103 goals for the club (206 appearances and 29 goals in the Yugoslav First League), in a generation that featured other notable players such as Drago Vabec, Zlatko Kranjčar, and Velimir Zajec.

In 1979, he moved to Germany where he spent three seasons playing for 1860 Munich, and scored 8 goals in 82 appearances for the German side. He then moved on to Austria Klagenfurt, where he played between 1982 and 1986, before returning to Croatia and spending two years with Jugokeramika (later known as Inter Zaprešić) and then two years with Radnik Velika Gorica, before retiring in 1990.

Managerial career
After retiring from active football, Senzen turned to managing and coaching. He first worked at Radnik's youth academy for a year, before taking over as club's manager and winning promotion to Prva HNL in 1991. Between 1991 and 1999 he managed several Croatian clubs, before coming to Dinamo Zagreb in 1999 as assistant manager to Ilija Lončarević. Dinamo won the championship title that season, and Senzen stayed at the club working at Dinamo's academy.

He currently works as a coach of the youngest age group at the Dinamo academy, the Zagići II (under-8 team) and occasionally does scouting for the club, bringing in youth players to Dinamo.

References

External links
 
Ivica Senzen 1860 Munchen stats at Fussballdaten.de 
Ivica Senzen profile at DinamoInAustralia.com 

1951 births
Living people
People from Sisak
Association football forwards
Yugoslav footballers
GNK Dinamo Zagreb players
TSV 1860 Munich players
FC Kärnten players
NK Inter Zaprešić players
Yugoslav First League players
Bundesliga players
Yugoslav expatriate footballers
Expatriate footballers in West Germany
Yugoslav expatriate sportspeople in West Germany
Expatriate footballers in Austria
Yugoslav expatriate sportspeople in Austria
Croatian football managers
GNK Dinamo Zagreb non-playing staff